Cayucos (Spanish for "Canoe") is an unincorporated coastal town in San Luis Obispo County, California, along California State Route 1 between Cambria to the north and Morro Bay to the south. The population was 2,505 at the 2020 census, down from 2,592 at the 2010 census.

History
The area was settled by the Chumash people approximately 11000 to 10000 BC. It included a large village to the south of Cayucos at Morro Creek.

The first European land exploration of Alta California, the Spanish Portolà expedition, camped in the vicinity of today's Cayucos on September 9, 1769. Coming from the previous campsite near Morro Bay, Franciscan missionary and expedition member Juan Crespi noted in his diary that "In the four hours that we traveled, making at the most three leagues, we encountered eight arroyos by which the water from the mountains runs to the sea, along whose edge we traveled. We halted at the eighth watering place in a moderately broad valley, into which enters an estuary fed by an arroyo of good water coming from the mountains." Crespi translator Herbert Bolton noted the camp location as Ellysley Creek (further along the coast to the northwest), but the description sounds more like Cayucos.

Cayucos is named for the cayuco, a Spanish name for a small canoe. It was named after the canoes used by the Chumash people to fish in the bay, particularly in the rich kelp beds just north of the current Cayucos pier. The town took its name from the old Rancho Moro y Cayucos, a Mexican land grant awarded in 1842 that includes the present area of the town.

Cass began developing the area with his business partner, Captain Ingals. Cass built a 900-foot pier and a warehouse to house cargo bound for San Francisco or Los Angeles. Eventually Cass returned to life on the sea and in 1875 real estate developer C.H. Phillips subdivided and sold the remaining portions of Rancho Moro y Cayucos. The original pier was swept away by a storm but has since been rebuilt.

On December 7, 1987, Pacific Southwest Airlines Flight 1771, bound from Los Angeles International Airport to San Francisco, was cruising above the central California coast when a recently terminated disgruntled USAir employee aboard the plane shot his ex-supervisor, both pilots, a flight attendant and presumably PSA's chief pilot, causing the airplane to enter a steep nosedive. All 43 passengers and crew aboard perished.	

In October 2009, Arthur Frommer's Budget Travel Magazine listed Cayucos as one of the "Coolest Small Towns in America".

Geography

Cayucos is located at  (35.438390, -120.890647).

Cayucos is home to Cayucos State Beach.

Demographics

2010
The 2010 United States Census reported that Cayucos had a population of 2,592. The racial makeup of Cayucos was 2,366 (91.3%) White, 6 (0.2%) African American, 12 (0.5%) Native American, 54 (2.1%) Asian, 8 (0.3%) Pacific Islander, 57 (2.2%) from other races, and 89 (3.4%) from two or more races. Hispanic or Latino of any race were 207 persons (8.0%).

The Census reported that 2,592 people (100% of the population) lived in households, 0 (0%) lived in non-institutionalized group quarters, and 0 (0%) were institutionalized.

There were 1,314 households, out of which 214 (16.3%) had children under the age of 18 living in them, 578 (44.0%) were opposite-sex married couples living together, 105 (8.0%) had a female householder with no husband present, 45 (3.4%) had a male householder with no wife present. There were 76 (5.8%) unmarried opposite-sex partnerships, and 10 (0.8%) same-sex married couples or partnerships. 471 households (35.8%) were made up of individuals, and 195 (14.8%) had someone living alone who was 65 years of age or older. The average household size was 1.97. There were 728 families (55.4% of all households); the average family size was 2.53.

The age of the population was spread out, with 337 people (13.0%) under the age of 18, 169 people (6.5%) aged 18 to 24, 488 people (18.8%) aged 25 to 44, 946 people (36.5%) aged 45 to 64, and 652 people (25.2%) who were 65 years of age or older. The median age was 53.0 years. For every 100 females, there were 91.9 males. For every 100 females age 18 and over, there were 93.2 males.

The homeowner vacancy rate was 4.6%; the rental vacancy rate was 12.8%. 1,555 people (60.0% of the population) lived in owner-occupied housing units and 1,037 people (40.0%) lived in rental housing units.

2000
As of the census of 2000, there were 2,943 people, 1,405 households, and 809 families residing in the CDP. The racial makeup of the CDP was 93.82% White, 6.80% Hispanic or Latino (of any race), 2.17% from two or more races, 2.11% from other races, 1.26% Asian, 0.37% Native American, 0.24% African American, and 0.03% Pacific Islander.

There were 1,405 households, out of which 19.6% had children under the age of 18 living with them, 46.4% were married couples living together, 7.5% had a female householder with no husband present, and 42.4% were non-families. 33.6% of all households were made up of individuals, and 13.2% had someone living alone who was 65 years of age or older. The average household size was 2.08 and the average family size was 2.62.

In the CDP, the population was spread out, with 16.8% under the age of 18, 6.5% from 18 to 24, 24.4% from 25 to 44, 28.7% from 45 to 64, and 23.5% who were 65 years of age or older. The median age was 46 years. For every 100 females, there were 91.7 males. For every 100 females age 18 and over, there were 91.1 males.

The median income for a household in the CDP was $42,841, and the median income for a family was $53,594. Males had a median income of $35,333 versus $31,359 for females. The per capita income for the CDP was $26,525. About 2.4% of families and 8.2% of the population were below the poverty line, including 7.1% of those under age 18 and 4.0% of those age 65 or over.

Government
In the California State Legislature, Cayucos is in the 17th State Senate District and the 35th Assembly District.

Economy 
Tourism plays a big role in the downtown Cayucos economy.

The Cayucos Pier is a popular surf spot and one of the best in the county, attracting many beach-goers.

Cayucos has its own Chamber of Commerce https://www.cayucoschamber.com/ and website http://www.cayucosbythesea.com/

References

Further reading
Reinman, F. M. (1961). Archeological investigations at Whale Rock Reservoir, Cayucos, California. Archeological report, 2. Sacramento, Calif.: State of California. Dept. of Natural Resources, Division of Beaches and Parks, Interpretive Services.

External links

Cayucos Chamber of Commerce
Concerned Citizens of Cayucos
Cayucos Community Groups
Visit Cayucos

Census-designated places in San Luis Obispo County, California
Morro Bay
Populated coastal places in California
Census-designated places in California
Populated places established in 1867
1867 establishments in California